Logo is a Local Government Area of Benue State, Nigeria. Its headquarters are in the town of Ugba.
 
It has an area of 1,408 km and a population of 169,063 at the 2006 census.

The postal code of the area is 980.

References

Local Government Areas in Benue State